William Duff (13 May 1922 – 14 February 2014) was a Scottish banker, Arabist and an advisor to the first vice-president and prime minister of the United Arab Emirates and a former ruler of Dubai, Rashid bin Saeed Al Maktoum. He is credited by many with initiating the modernisation of the Emirate.

Biography

William Duff (originally MacDuff which was later shortened to Duff) was born in Singapore on 13 May 1922 to Eleanor and Robert Duff who ran a business there. His education was at Cheltenham College and, later, at the Hertford College, University of Oxford, from where he secured a master's degree in Eastern Studies.

While his father endured incarceration, by the Japanese till 1945, in the Changi Prison, a British jail used by the Japanese as a prisoner of war camp after the fall of Singapore in 1942, Duff was drafted into the British Army and his first commission was at the 1st Battalion Princess Louise's Kensington Regiment. He was involved in the World War II, fighting in Italy, Sudan and Palestine. During his stay at Palestine, he is known to have developed an affinity for the Arab culture. It was there he met his future wife, Irenka Trachimovic, a Polish national, at a party at The British Embassy in 1946, whom he married the same year.

On his retirement from the Army as a Captain, Duff went back to Oxford University to read Arabic and, later, continued his Arabic studies at the Middle East Centre for Arab Studies, Shemlan, Lebanon. His civilian career started at the Imperial Bank of Persia, (then Bank of Iran and the Middle East, which over the years became the British Bank of the Middle East and finally, HSBC), and worked for 10 years at various countries in the Middle East such as Iraq, Jordan, Lebanon, Syria, Sudan and finally in Kuwait.

The next assignment was as the advisor to the Kuwait royal family, on invitation from Sheikh Jaber Al-Ahmad Al-Sabah who would later become the Ruler of Kuwait, a brief stint during which he had the opportunity to meet Sheikh Rashid bin Saeed Al Maktoum, the ruler of Dubai when the latter paid a visit to Kuwait in 1959. The next year, Sheikh Rashid invited Duff to Dubai, which was a part of the Trucial States during that time, to join as his financial advisor on 2 October 1960, and the friendship between the two is reported to have paved way for the modernisation of Dubai.

In 1966, when oil was discovered in Dubai, the Emirate was exposed to sudden riches, and as the financial advisor to the ruler, Duff, who had signatorial powers, is reported to have imposed fiscal discipline in the Emirate and advised the ruler on major developmental programs. He is known to have been the brain behind the establishment of the Departments of Finance and the Department of Customs, and helped put in place an infrastructure facility whereby the commercial activities of Dubai grew with the advent of global oil companies and workers from overseas, mainly from the Indian subcontinent.

Legacy

Under the guidance of William Duff, who spoke classical Arabic, Dubai Government channelled the newly opened revenue streams for setting up infrastructural facilities such as Sea ports, Airports, roads, hotels, utilities and communications. He is also credited with the establishment of a Seafarer's Mission, a kindergarten school, a Christian cemetery and Dubai English Speaking School, the first English curriculum school in Dubai which was run by his wife, Irenka, till a few years before Duff's death. His efforts were known in inviting foreign companies to invest in business in Dubai for which he is reported to have attempted to eliminate bribery from the administration.

Duff's involvement is reported in the establishment of Port Rashid in 1972, the first port in the region as well as in the making of the Port of Jebel Ali in 1979, which has grown over the years to become the largest man made harbour and the 9th businesst container sea port in the world. Six years after the opening of Jebel Ali port, Duff assisted in the creation of Jebel Ali Free Zone in 1985 to supplement the activities of the port.

The creation of a Department of Finance is considered as one of the principal contributions of Duff, a department he advised on till the death of Sheikh Rashid in 1990. His contributions are reported behind the establishment of the Customs Department to foster Dubai's trade with other countries, initially by facilitating imports through Dubai Creek and providing a market place for the traders along the Creek, which is the present day Deira Souk. Dubai Electric Co. is another of his contributions which was later renamed as Dubai Electricity and Water Authority and is powering the Emirate of Dubai. Duff is also known to have blocked an attempt by officials to channel the Emirates reserves to the Bank of Credit and Commerce International, which went bankrupt in 1991.

Relationship with Sheikh Rashid bin Saeed Al Maktoum
Bill Duff is known to have had a close relationship with Sheikh Rashid bin Saeed Al Maktoum, ten years elder to him, ever since their first meeting in Kuwait in 1959. It is reported that Duff hosted Al Maktoum several times in Scotland at Gleneagles Hotel, during the latter's visits to the place. The relationship is also cited as the reason behind the donation of  1.16 million the erstwhile Dubai ruler made to the Exeter University for its library and later, for the Institute for Arab and Islamic Studies.

Later years
After the death of Sheikh Rashid in 1990, Duff slowly withdrew from the Dubai administration and restricted himself to his role as an Honorary Advisor to the Ruler. He continued his life in Dubai where his wife, Irenka, managed the Dubai English Speaking School, the school he founded, till a few years before Duff's death. He died in his sleep on 14 February 2014 at his villa along the Jumeirah Beach, leaving Eleanor, his wife, Diana Barnardiston and Sheila Duff-Earles, his two daughters and four grandchildren, Michael, Andrew, Nicholas and Caroline. His mortal remains were laid to rest at the nearby Christian Cemetery in Jumeirah, the one he had helped establish.

See also

 Rashid bin Saeed Al Maktoum
 Port of Jebel Ali
 Port Rashid
 Arabist

References

External links
 
 

1922 births
2014 deaths
Scottish Arabists
Scottish expatriates in the United Arab Emirates
People educated at Cheltenham College
Alumni of Hertford College, Oxford
British Army personnel of World War II
Middlesex Regiment officers
British bankers
20th-century British businesspeople
British expatriates in Iraq
British expatriates in Jordan
British expatriates in Lebanon
British expatriates in Syria
British expatriates in Sudan
British expatriates in Kuwait
British expatriates in the United Arab Emirates